Evergreen Colony is a Hutterite colony and census-designated place (CDP) in Faulk County, South Dakota, United States. The population was 111 at the 2020 census. It was first listed as a CDP prior to the 2020 census.

Demographics

References 

Census-designated places in Faulk County, South Dakota
Census-designated places in South Dakota
Hutterite communities in the United States